John Peter Wakefield (5 April 1915 in Marylebone, London – 24 April 1942 in Wargrave, Berkshire) was an English racing car driver.

He debuted in a British Alta (1936), next year
in a Maserati 6CM at Gran Premio di Firenze, 10th place (1937),
ran a British ERA (1938), and became the
second to own a Maserati 4CL (1939), in which he won the Grand Prix of Naples, the French GP in Picardy, and the Grand Prix de l´Albigeois, coming in second at Rheims and third at the Prix de Berne.

During the Second World War Wakefield joined the Fleet Air Arm. He was killed whilst a test pilot working for Vickers Armstrong and died in a flying accident.

References

English racing drivers
1915 births
1942 deaths
Fleet Air Arm personnel of World War II
British civilians killed in World War II
Victims of aviation accidents or incidents in 1942
British test pilots
Aviators killed in aviation accidents or incidents in England